Berakhot (lit. "Blessings") is the first tractate of Seder Zeraim ("Order of Seeds") of the Mishnah and of the Talmud. The tractate discusses the rules of prayers, particularly the Shema and the Amidah, and blessings for various circumstances.

Since a large part of the tractate is concerned with the many berakhot, all comprising the formal liturgical element beginning with words "Blessed are you, Lord our God….", it is named for the initial word of these special form of prayer.

Berakhot is the only tractate in Seder Zeraim to have Gemara – rabbinical analysis of and commentary on the Mishnah – in the Babylonian Talmud. There is however Jerusalem Talmud on all the tractates in Seder Zeraim. There is also a Tosefta for this tractate.

The Jewish religious laws detailed in this tractate have shaped the liturgies of all the Jewish communities since the later Talmudic period and continue to be observed by traditional Jewish communities until the present, with only minor variations, as expounded upon by subsequent Jewish legal codes.

Subject matter
The Mishna of this tractate deals with aspects of the daily prayer services, primarily the laws about formal prayers and blessings, and only infrequently or incidentally with the content, theology, or rationales for these prayers. These aspects are discussed more at length in the Tosefta, Gemara, and passages in the Midrash. Although the Talmud identifies some biblical basis for the topics dealt with in the tractate, the Mishnah organizes the material according to topics, with only occasional references to biblical sources.

The laws regarding three liturgical categories addressed in this tractate are as follows:

  recital of the Shema prayer every morning and evening
  the central prayer of each service, recited standing silently, called the Amidah, or Tefilla in the terminology of the Talmud 
  blessings recited for the enjoyment of food, drinks and fragrances and on significant occasions or circumstances.

The first three chapters of the tractate discuss the recital of the Shema, the next two the recital of the Tefilla, and the last four the various blessings.

Shema

The Talmud explain this as a specific commandment to recite the two paragraphs in which the requirement occur (Deut. 6:4–9, 11:13–21) to be performed twice per day, in the evening ("when you lie down") and in the morning ("when you rise up").  The tractate defines the exact periods when the Shema should be said in the evening and the morning, specifies conditions for its recital, and who is exempt from this mitzvah ("commandment").

The Mishnah also mandates the addition of a third section to the Shema, relating the commandment of ritual fringes and the daily obligation to acknowledge the Exodus from Egypt.

Prayer

The tractate deals with the principal rabbinic prayer, recited quietly, without interruption, and while standing and known as the Amidah or "standing prayer", or simply as Tefillah ("prayer"). Its original version comprised eighteen blessings all beginning with the standard formulation "Blessed are you, Lord our God…". A nineteenth blessing was added at a later stage of the Talmudic period.

The Mishnah takes the structure and text of the prayer as a given  and tefillah as a general concept refers to the regular prayers instituted by the members of the Great Assembly and the sages who followed them. Three daily prayer services were instituted: Shacharit during the morning hours until four hours of the day have passed, and corresponding to the morning daily sacrificial offering at the Temple in Jerusalem, Mincha during the afternoon, corresponding to the afternoon sacrificial offering and Ma'ariv in the evening after nightfall. The times for these services are also connected in the tractate to the practices of the patriarchs Abraham, Isaac and Jacob.

On days when an additional offering was sacrificed in the Temple, namely Shabbat, Festivals, the intermediate days of the Festivals and the New Moon, an additional prayer service, Musaf, was recited between the morning and afternoon services.

The Mishnah and subsequent discussion in the Gemara consider the designated times for the three services; occasions when the full eighteen blessings, or an abbreviated versions should be recited; circumstances in which a person does not have to pray as normally required facing towards the Temple in Jerusalem; traditions about the required state of mind when praying and the role of the Shaliach tzibbur ("representative of the congregation")  who leads the repetition of the prayer when a minyan ("quorum") is present.

Blessings

A "berakhah" is a formal liturgical unit that is usually formulated with the opening words "Blessed are you, Lord our God, King of the Universe..." The tractate discusses the blessings for specific occasions, and the Tosefta states that the theological rationale for this is a recognition that a person should not benefit from the world without first acknowledging that God is the source of the abundance.

The tractate formulates and describes the use of a number of categories of blessings, for the following: 
 enjoyment (birkhot ha'nehenin), recited in appreciation of physical enjoyment including various blessings over food, drink and fragrances; different blessings are assigned for vegetables, fruit, wine, baked goods, bread, and those items which do not directly come from produce of the earth, such as milk, meat, fish and eggs.
 performing a positive commandment (birkhot hamitzvot) such as the lighting of Sabbath candles, usually before the performance of the mitzvah, except for netilat yadai'im ("ritual washing of hands"), immersion in a mikveh to attain ritual purity, and the immersion of a convert, when the blessing is recited after the mitzvah is performed.
 seeing awe-inspiring natural phenomena (birkhot ha're'iya) of various types,  such as upon seeing the ocean, great mountains, a rainbow or lightning; or seeing a place where miracles occurred for the Jewish people or for individuals, as well as for places where tragic or catastrophic events occurred.
 special time bound events (birkhot ha'zman) of two primary types — when performing a regular, but infrequent commandment such as the celebration of a Festival, or for an unusual occurrence, such as the redemption of a first born; and when enjoying something for the first time, such as wearing new clothes or eating a type of fruit for the first time in a season, and in general upon experiencing any unusual benefit or joy.

In addition to the blessings to be recited before eating, the tractate discusses the blessing ordained in the Torah, known as Birkat Hamazon ("the Grace after Meals"), to be recited after eating food; while the Torah obligation applies only to a meal that satisfies a person's hunger, the rabbis of the Mishna required that it be recited after eating a k'zayit measure of bread. When three or more men have eaten together, one of them is required to invite the others to recite the Grace after Meals in what is known as the zimmun ("invitation to bless").

The tractate formulates the berakha m'ayn shalosh ("blessing abridged from the three blessings" of the Grace after Meals), recited for food or drink made from any of the seven species — wheat, barley, grape, fig, pomegranates, olive (oil), and date (honey) — which are listed in the Hebrew Bible as being special products of the Land of Israel.For all other foods, besides bread or the products of the seven species, a one blessing berakha acharona ("blessing recited after eating or drinking") is recited.

The tractate also discusses the various requirements for Kiddush, the sanctification prayers recited over wine on Shabbat and Festivals, and Havdalah, the blessings for the ceremony recited at the end of the Shabbat and Festivals.

Structure and content
The tractate consists of nine chapters and 57 paragraphs (mishnayot). It has a Gemara – rabbinical analysis of and commentary on the Mishnah – of 64 double-sided pages in the standard Vilna Edition Shas of the Babylonian Talmud and 68 double-sided pages in the Jerusalem Talmud. There is a Tosefta of six chapters for this tractate.

Tractate Berakhot in the Babylonian Talmud has the highest word per daf average due to its large quantity of aggadic material. Some of these passages offer insights into the rabbis' attitudes towards prayer, often defined as a plea for divine mercy, but also cover many other themes, including biblical interpretations, biographical narratives, interpretation of dreams, and folklore.

An overview of the content of chapters is as follows:

 Chapter 1 determines the time and the manner of the reading of Shema in the evening and in the morning, and the number of blessings which precede and follow the reading; the controversy between the Houses of Hillel and Shammai regarding whether to stand, recline or sit during the recital; and the blessings before and after the Shema.
 Chapter 2 addresses the appropriate inner intention and attention (kavanah) for the recital of the Shema; whether reading it silently is considered a valid recital; whether incorrect pronunciation or other mistakes invalidate the recital; permission for laborers to say the Shema while working; and exemptions from recital due to inability to recite it with kavanah, such a recently married man; a series of parables regarding Rabban Gamliel are cited to explain why exemptions may be acceptable.
 Chapter 3  continues to discuss total or partial exemption from this duty, such as for mourners, women, slaves, and minors, and the obligation of a person in a state of ritual uncleanness (tumah) to recite the Shema, Amidah and other blessings.
 Chapter 4 discusses the main prayer, the Shemoneh Esrei (literally "eighteen") or Amidah (literally "standing"), or simply Tefillah ("prayer") as it called in the Talmud, and considers the appropriate time-frames in which to recite this prayer in the morning, afternoon and evening; the  abbreviated Amidah’s wording and when it is recited; reciting the Amidah while riding or driving; and the additional service ("musaf") recited on Sabbaths and Festivals.
 Chapter 5 considers the necessity of preparing for prayer, praying with "kavanah" during the Amidah and the prohibition against interrupting one’s prayer during the Amidah, guarding against error, especially regarding additions to or deviations in the form of the prayer; insertion of specific supplications such as for rain; and the course of action when the reader (shaliach tzibbur) makes a mistake while reciting the Amidah for the congregation.
 Chapter 6 examines the principle that before eating any kind of food, one must recite a blessing, and determines the form of blessing before and after various kinds of food.
 Chapter 7 discusses the procedures for the concluding blessings known as Birkat Hamazon, (blessing for the sustenance) following a formal meal, usually defined by eating bread, at which three or more have eaten together, and the zimmun – invitation to join the grace.
 Chapter 8 formulates the rules for the washing of hands in connection with a meal, reciting grace over the wine-cup; Kiddush, the sanctification of Shabbat and Jewish holidays and Havdalah, the concluding ceremony of Shabbat; it also notes the disputes between the Houses of Shammai and Hillel regarding blessings recited at meals, especially to the order of their recital.
 Chapter 9 discusses various special blessings that can be made for many occasions, such as upon coming across a place where a miracle was performed or places of religious significance, or upon hearing thunder or seeing natural phenomena such as lightning or a rainbow, experiencing life-milestones, and deliverance from danger; additionally, various additional instructions are given to ensure respect for the Temple Mount and the name of God in personal greetings and to resist heresy by stressing a belief in the world-to-come.

Placement in the Order Zeraim
The topics of tractate Berakhot, relating to prayers and blessings, are seemingly quite different from the agricultural laws of the other tractates of this Order and several rationales have been proposed for this placement:

According to Maimonides, because food is the foremost necessity for life, the laws concerning its production and use – the Order Zeraim –  was placed at beginning of the Mishnah. However, to first express gratitude to God for these gifts, the one non-agricultural tractate which opens this order is Berakhot.

Another explanation given is the fact that since reciting the Shema in the evening is the first religious duty of the day, this may account for the placement of the tractate at the beginning of the first Order of the Mishnah – the important principle implied in the first question of the tractate, "From what time is it allowed to read the evening Shema?" is that the day is calculated from evening to evening and thus the Mishnah begins with the first mitzvah – commandment – that a Jew is obligated to fulfill every day.

The Talmud itself (Shabbat 31a), cites an explanation given by Resh Lakish, who homiletically states that the first six terms in a verse in Isaiah refer to the six orders of the Mishna  – and the first word, "emunah" (faith),  corresponds to Zeraim. This is seen as an explanation for why the regulations regarding prayers and blessings – and especially those concerning the recital of the Shema prayer – the Jewish declaration of faith in the One God – came to be grouped with agricultural laws, which are seen both as an expression of faith through reliance on God and, according to the commentator Rashi, (1040 – 1105 CE), as an expression of faithfulness in social relationships, by the provisions of dues to the poor, the priests and the Levites as described in the other tractates of this Order.

Historical context and influence
Composed towards the end of the Mishnaic period (c. 30 BCE - 200 CE) in the Roman province of Judea,  the Mishnah of tractate Berakhot contains traditions covering the full range of sages from the period, from the Second Temple period until the end of the period of the Tannaim.

This tractate, along with other literature from the Second Temple era, especially the liturgical texts of the Dead Sea Scrolls, has provided scholars with a better understanding of the place of Jewish prayer in the broader evolution of Jewish worship of the time when it coexisted alongside the sacrificial worship of the Temple in Jerusalem. The tractate also provides significant information about the eating customs of the Jews of Upper Mesopotamia, called "Babylonia" (chapter 6), and of the Jews in Syria Palaestina, also called "Land of Israel", which were largely modeled on those of the Romans (chapter 8) by the time the Mishna was written (c. 200 CE).

Initially, the prayers instituted by the Talmudic rabbis were primarily learned and transmitted orally and prayer texts may have been flexible within these accepted structures. Only around the fourth century CE does synagogue architecture in the Land of Israel begin to consistently reflect the physical orientation towards Jerusalem required by rabbinic worship. By that time, prayer had become a function of the synagogue, with a shaliach tzibbur ("leader of the congregation") who recited the prayers out loud to enable those incapable of praying properly on their own to fulfill their obligations to participate by listening and responding "amen".

Around the essential main prayers of the Shema and Amidah, other elements seem to have arisen, probably in the later Talmudic period during the time of the Amoraim. These included the recitation of psalms and other collections of biblical verses known as pesukei dezimra ("verses of song") prior to the main prayers in order to set an appropriate frame of mind for praying (Berakhot 5:1), and the recitation of individual prayers after the Amidah. These began as private supplications, including personal requests (Tosefot to Berakhot 3:10), but were gradually formalized. These elements took different forms in the Land of Israel and in Babylonia, as the findings of some of these texts in the Cairo Genizah have shown.

During the Talmudic period, the norm developed that the ideal language for prayer was Hebrew, although other languages were considered acceptable for many prayers (BT, Berakhot 13a). By the end of the Talmudic period, consensus existed as to the basic formulation of most prayers, though regional variations remained.

By the end of the Talmudic period (c. 500), two distinct prayer rites had developed, "Land of Israel" and "Babylonia". However, by the end of the Geonic period (c. 1038), the prayers of all the traditional Jewish ethnic divisions had largely conformed to the liturgy of the Babylonian Jewish community, and this has remained so until the present time, with only minor textual and structural variations among them.

Liturgical uses

Both the Babylonian Talmud (BT) and Jerusalem Talmud (JT) include original prayers, many of which have been included in the Siddur, the daily prayer-book. The prayers are mostly the same in form and content in both Talmuds.

Many of the Talmudic sages arranged personal petitions that they would say at the conclusion of the Amidah, some of which are cited in this tractate  Elohai ("My God"), the private meditation of the fourth century sage, Mar son of Ravina, as recorded in this tractate, has become universally accepted as the concluding meditation of the Amidah in the liturgies of all the Jewish communities. It begins with the words "My God, guard my tongue from evil and my lips from deceitful speech" and reflects the opening meditation of the Amidah "O Lord, open my lips so that my mouth may declare your praise" in that, having asked God to guide what to say in his presence, it now asks Him to guide what not to say in the presence of other human beings.

Yehi Ratzon ("May it be Your will"), the personal prayer of the late second–early third century sage, Rabbi Yehuda Hanasi, as recorded in  this tractate, requesting protection from harmful events, people and temptations, which he recited every day after the morning service, has been incorporated at the beginning of the morning service in both the Ashkenazi and Sefardi liturgies, albeit with minor textual variants in each.

The second part of the Nishmat prayer, recited on Sabbath and Festivals, from the words "If our mouths were as full of song as the sea...we could not sufficiently praise You O Lord our God" is the text of a thanksgiving prayer for rain cited in this tractate.

Another prayer beginning with Elohai ("My God") and continuing with "the soul which you have given me is pure" is recorded in this tractate (BT, Berakhot 60b) expressing gratitude to God for restoring one’s spirit upon awakening in the morning and for providing the person with the requirements for  life and health. This text is the introduction to the series of fifteen blessings recited in the early morning service in both the Ashkenazi and Sefardi liturgies, in accordance with the teaching on Berakhot 60b, that as one experiences the phenomena of the new day, one should bless God for providing them.

The concluding statement of the tractate in both the Babylonian and Jerusalem Talmud (BT, Berakhot 64a) is Amar Rabbi Elazar ("Rabbi Elazer said"), "Torah scholars increase peace in the world..." and it is recited at the end of the Kabbalat Shabbat service welcoming the Sabbath on Friday night in the Ashkenazi liturgy, and towards the end of the Musaf service on Sabbaths and Festivals in both the Ashkenazi and Sefardi liturgies.

See also
 List of Jewish prayers and blessings

References

External links
 Full Hebrew and English text of the Mishnah for tractate Berakhot on Sefaria

Talmud